Bulambuli District is a district in Eastern Uganda. The district is named after 'chief town', Bulambuli, where the district headquarters are located.

Location
Bulambuli District is bordered by Nakapiripirit District to the north, Kapchorwa District to the east, Sironko District to the south and Bukedea District to the west. The coordinates of the district are:01 22N, 34 09E.

Overview
Bulambuli District was created by Act of the Ugandan Parliament, in 2009, and became operational on 1 July 2010. Prior to that, the district was part of Sironko District. The terrain in the southern part of the district is mountainous and is prone to flash flooding. The northern part of the district, closer to Nakapiripirit District, is more dry and is prone to clean water shortages.

Population
In 1991, the national population census estimated the district population at about 64,600. The next national census in 2002 estimated the population of the district at about 97,300. In 2012, the population of Bulambuli District was estimated at 125,400.

Economic activities
Subsistence agriculture and animal husbandry are the two main economic activities in the district. Crops grown include:

Prominent people
Some of the prominent people from the district include the following:
 Engineer Irene Nafuna Muloni – Electrical engineer, businesswoman and politician. Current Minister of oil, energy and minerals in Uganda's cabinet. Member of Parliament for Bulambuli District Women's Representative in Uganda's 9th parliament (2011–2016).

Mabonga Jesse Guild President Kumi University 2022
DAVID KATENYA, Current MP Bulambuli

See also
 Bulambuli
 Eastern Uganda
 Uganda Districts

References

External links
  Map of Bulambuli District Map At Maplandia.com

 
Districts of Uganda
Bugisu sub-region
Eastern Region, Uganda